This is a list of placenames in Scotland which have subsequently been given to parts of Sri Lanka by Scottish planters. Almost without exception Scottish place names in Sri Lanka occur either in the Hill Country plantations or in Colombo.

As the Scottish coffee and tea planters, including Sri Lanka's first tea planter James Taylor, settled in the country, they named their plantations after their home towns in Scotland.Charles Hay Cameron and his sons named their estates after Lochiel and Erroll their ancestral peerages, as well as  Moray, Forres, Glencairn and St Regulus. In Colombo, places were named after Sri Lanka's British governors including Thomas Maitland.

Hill Country

 Abbey Craig
 Aberdeen Falls
 Argyle
 Arthur's Seat
 Balmoral
 Banff
 Barcaple
 Blair Atholl
 Blinkbonney
 Braemore
 Braemar
 Caledonia
 Camnethan
 Caskieben
 Clydesdale
 Craig
 Craigie Lea
 Cullen
 Dalhousie
 Dunbar
 Dunsinane
 Dunkeld
 Edinburgh
 Elgin - named after Elgin,  a major town of Moray in Scotland.
 Erroll
 Eskadale
 Fordyce
 Forres
 Frotoft
 Glasgow
 Glassaugh
 Gleneagles
 Goat fell
 Hatton
 Highland
 Holyrood
 Iona
 Kinross
 Kirkoswald
 Leitch
 Lammermoor
 Liddesdale
 Logie
 Lonach
 Macduff
 Mayfield
 Melfort
 Midlothian
 Morar
 Moray
 Mount Vernon
 Nairn
 Newburgh
 Oliphant
 Panmure
 Portree
 Robgill
 Rosneath
 Relugas
 St Andrew's
 St Clair's
 Sanquhar
 Strathdon
 Strathspey
 Sutherland
 Tillicoultry
 Urie
 Ythanside

Low Country
 Clyde
 Culloden 
 Dalkeith
 Lauderdale
 Perth

Colombo
 Kinross Avenue
 Maitland Crescent

Notes

References 
 

Scottish place names
Sri Lanka
Scottish place names
Sri Lanka, Scottish place names in